Daniel Jansen Van Doorn (born ) is a Canadian male volleyball player. He is a member of the Canada men's national volleyball team and French club Tours VB, a gold medallist at the 2015 Men's NORCECA Volleyball Championship, and a competitor at the 2016 Summer Olympics.

Personal life
Daniel Jansen Van Doorn was born in Langley, British Columbia to parents Marvin and Carolyn. He has four siblings, two of whom have also played volleyball at a high level. Daniel started playing volleyball at the age of 14, and grew up idolizing former national team member Sébastien Ruette, who became his inspiration to pursue a career in volleyball.

Career

Club
Daniel was a member of the Trinity Western Spartans from 2009 to 2013. During his time there, he helped the team win back to back CIS Volleyball Championships in 2011 and 2012, as well as a second-place finish in the 2010 tournament. After graduating in 2013, he signed with French team Tourcoing Lille Metropole. He helped the team rise from a 12th place standing at the halfway mark in the season to finish first in the Pro B Championship, and earn promotion to the Pro A Championship. After two years with the team, he left and joined Greek side Pamvohaikos, before moving back to France to play for Tours VB. In 2017, he helped the team win the CEV Cup against Trentino.

National Team
Daniel joined the senior national team in 2014. He has helped the team win gold at the 2015 Men's NORCECA Volleyball Championship, and was a member of the squad that finished 5th at the 2016 Summer Olympics. 
During the 2017 World League Finals, he also helped the team win bronze.

Sporting Achievements

Club
 2010  CIS Men's Volleyball Championship, with Trinity Western Spartans
 2011  CIS Men's Volleyball Championship, with Trinity Western Spartans
 2012  CIS Men's Volleyball Championship, with Trinity Western Spartans
 2013/2014  Pro B Championship, with Tourcoing Lille Metropole

National Team
 2015  NORCECA Championship
 2017  FIVB World League

Individual
 2015 NORCECA Championship - Best Middle Blocker

References

External links
 Profile at olympic.ca

1990 births
Living people
Canadian men's volleyball players
Place of birth missing (living people)
Volleyball players at the 2016 Summer Olympics
Trinity Western Spartans volleyball players
Olympic volleyball players of Canada